Tennis competitions at the 2022 South American Games in Asunción, Paraguay were held from 11 to 15 October 2022 at the Rakiura Resort cluster in Luque, a sub-venue outside Asunción.

Five medal events were scheduled to be contested; singles and doubles for both men and women and mixed doubles. A total of 54 athletes (26 men and 28 women) competed in the events. Participating players had to be at least 14 years old at the start of the competition.

Players who got the gold and silver medals in the singles events will qualified for the 2023 Pan American Games, with the qualification quotas going to the players and not their NOCs.

Chile were the South American Games tennis competitions defending champions having won them in the previous edition in Cochabamba 2018. Colombia won the tennis competitions with two gold medals and one bronze.

Participating nations
A total of 10 nations registered athletes for the tennis competitions. Each nation was able to enter a maximum of 6 players (3 per gender) and was able to participate with up to 3 players in the singles events and a pair of players in the doubles events. Each player can compete in a maximum of
two events.

 (6 players)
 (6)
 (6)
 (6)
 (5)
 (4)
 (6)
 (6)
 (4)
 (5)

Venue
The tennis competitions were scheduled to be held at the Rakiura Resort cluster in Luque.

Medal summary

Medal table

Medalists

References

External links
 ASU2022 Tennis

2022 South American Games events
2022
South American Games
2022
Tennis at the 2022 South American Games